"History" is the first single from Canadian band Story Untold. The members of Story Untold are from Quebec, Canada, which is also home to Simple Plan. Simple Plan has known the five-piece for a while, and the French Canadians teamed up to write Story Untold's newest single "History". The song is about how the band is going to make it big, even if it seems like a crazy idea: "You can call me crazy/But when I close my eyes/I can see it clearly/I can see the shining lights." The song was co-penned with Simple Plan's vocalist Pierre Bouvier and drummer Chuck Comeau. The song is just one of seven songs on the band's self-titled EP. History also has a music video where the band is a part of an underground fight club. It features each boy taking on a different fighter, and it subtly introduces each band member for those who have never heard of Story Untold before. An acoustic version of the song does appear on YouTube but is not featured on the Story Untold EP.

Track listing 

 Digital download
 "History" – 3:21

Personnel
Story Untold
 Janick Thibault - lead vocals, songwriting
 Jessy Bergy - Lead guitar 
 Mehdi Zidani - Drums
 Max Cloutier - Rhythm guitar
 Aiden Von Rose - Bass guitar

References

2016 singles
2016 songs
Hopeless Records singles
Songs written by Chuck Comeau
Songs written by Pierre Bouvier